John Morrissey (1831–1878) was an American boxer and politician.

John Morrissey may also refer to:

 John Morrissey (baseball) (1856–1884), Major League Baseball player
 John Morrissey (footballer) (born 1965), English footballer
 John Morrissey (rugby union) (1939–2013), New Zealand rugby union player
 John P. Morrissey (politician) (1885–1966), New York politician
 John P. Morrissey (biologist), Irish biologist
 Johnny Morrissey (born 1940), English footballer
 John Morrissey (Australian politician), Victorian state MP from 1897 to 1907